Danilo Kunze (born 29 June 1971) is a retired German football striker.

References

1971 births
Living people
East German footballers
German footballers
Chemnitzer FC players
FC Erzgebirge Aue players
FSV Zwickau players
VfB Fortuna Chemnitz players
VfB Auerbach players
2. Bundesliga players
Association football forwards